The Abiathar King Williams House is a historic house located at 43 Ingell Street in Taunton, Massachusetts, United States.

Description and history 
The -story, wood-framed house was begun in 1843 by Abiathar King Williams, member of the locally prominent Williams family, and finished by his brother George. It has simple vernacular Greek Revival styling, mainly in its front door surround, which has sidelight windows, and pilasters supporting an entablature. The Williams family were an economically significant force in the area, and their descendants still owned this house in 1984.

The house was listed on the National Register of Historic Places on July 5, 1984.

See also
National Register of Historic Places listings in Taunton, Massachusetts

References

National Register of Historic Places in Taunton, Massachusetts
Houses in Taunton, Massachusetts
Houses on the National Register of Historic Places in Bristol County, Massachusetts
Houses completed in 1843
Greek Revival houses in Massachusetts